Lapita is a genus of flies in the family Dolichopodidae. It is known from New Caledonia, Fiji and Vanuatu.

Species

 Lapita acanthotarsus Bickel, 2002
 Lapita adusta Bickel, 2016
 Lapita batiqere Bickel, 2016
 Lapita bicolor Bickel, 2016
 Lapita boucheti Bickel, 2002
 Lapita bouloupari Bickel, 2002
 Lapita caerula Bickel, 2002
 Lapita chazeaui Bickel, 2002
 Lapita coloisuva Bickel, 2016
 Lapita couleensis Bickel, 2002
 Lapita cudo Bickel, 2002
 Lapita delaco Bickel, 2016
 Lapita denticauda Bickel, 2016
 Lapita dogny Bickel, 2002
 Lapita dugdalei Bickel, 2002
 Lapita dumbea Bickel, 2002
 Lapita duo Bickel, 2002
 Lapita expirata Bickel, 2002
 Lapita greenwoodi (Bezzi, 1928)
 Lapita inhisa Bickel, 2002
 Lapita irwini Bickel, 2002
 Lapita kanakorum Bickel, 2002
 Lapita kraussi Bickel, 2002
 Lapita kuitarua Bickel, 2016
 Lapita laniensis Bickel, 2002
 Lapita maafusalatu Bickel, 2016
 Lapita macuata Bickel, 2016
 Lapita morleyi Bickel, 2016
 Lapita mou Bickel, 2002
 Lapita nishidai Bickel, 2002
 Lapita noumeana (Bigot, 1890)
 Lapita orstomorum Bickel, 2002
 Lapita paradoxa Bickel, 2016
 Lapita ponerihouen Bickel, 2002
 Lapita pouebo Bickel, 2002
 Lapita raveni Bickel, 2002
 Lapita rembai Bickel, 2002
 Lapita rivularis Bickel, 2002
 Lapita sanma Bickel, 2016
 Lapita sarnati Bickel, 2016
 Lapita savura Bickel, 2016
 Lapita schlingeri Bickel, 2002
 Lapita sedlacekorum Bickel, 2002
 Lapita semita Bickel, 2002
 Lapita spilota Bickel, 2002
 Lapita sylvatica Bickel, 2002
 Lapita tavuki Bickel, 2016
 Lapita ternata Bickel, 2002
 Lapita tillierorum Bickel, 2002
 Lapita timocii Bickel, 2016
 Lapita tuimerekei Bickel, 2016
 Lapita vakalevu Bickel, 2016
 Lapita vatudiri Bickel, 2016
 Lapita veilaselase Bickel, 2016
 Lapita yahoue Bickel, 2002
 Lapita yate Bickel, 2002

References

Dolichopodidae genera
Sciapodinae
Diptera of Australasia
Insects of New Caledonia
Insects of Fiji
Fauna of Vanuatu